Skeel may refer to:
 Albret Skeel (1572–1639), a Danish nobleman who held the office of Admiral of the Realm from 1616 to 1623
 Burt E. Skeel (1894–1924), a United States Air Force and civilian pilot
 Caroline Anne James Skeel (1872–1951), British historian of Wales
 Christian Skeel (born 1956), a Danish artist and composer
 Ingeborg Skeel (c. 1545–1604), a Danish noblewoman
 Mogens Skeel (1651–1694), a Danish playwright
 Richard Skeel (living), an American college administrator and baseball coach

See also 
 Skeels (disambiguation)